Cheshmeh Chenar may refer to:
 Cheshmeh Chenar-e Mard Khoda
 Cheshmeh Chenar-e Yasuj